Bruce DeGroot (born October 30, 1963) is an American politician and attorney who served in the Missouri House of Representatives from the 101st district from 2017 through 2023.  He represents the 101st district, which includes parts of Chesterfield, Wildwood, Ellisville, and Clarkson Valley, since 2011.

Early life and career

Bruce DeGroot was born in Sioux Falls, South Dakota and is a descendant of Buffalo Bill.  Rep. DeGroot graduated from Sioux Falls Christian High School in 1982. He earned his bachelor's degree in 1987 from the University of South Dakota and his J.D. from Saint Louis University School of Law. 

Mr. DeGroot currently serves as counsel at the lawfirm of Brown & James in the  St. Louis and Columbia, Mo., offices.

He currently resides in Chesterfield. He attends the Ascension Parish, where he is also a board member for the Ascension Athletic Association.

References

External links
 Official Missouri House of Representatives Profile
 Campaign Finance Information
 Vote Smart Profile
 Brown & James Profile

1963 births
Living people
Republican Party members of the Missouri House of Representatives
21st-century American politicians